The Battle of Mulayda was the last major battle during the period of the Second Saudi State which occurred on 21 January 1891. Following problems over Zakat and the arrest of the Rashidi leader, Ibn Sabhan, the Rashidis planned to end the Saudi State and conquer both Qassim region and Riyadh. The Rashidis and their Arab clan allies successfully ended the Second Saudi State, and forced the House of Saud led by Abdul Rahman bin Faisal and their allies to flee.

References

 Musil, op, p. 279
 Hogarth, The Penetration of Arabia, p. 288
 Winder. p. 499
 Anne Blunt, op, cit, vol,2 p. 2-3
 Philby, Arabia of the Wahabis p. 275

1891 in Saudi Arabia
Mulayda
Mulayda